The Penkalas Bridge is a Roman bridge over the Penkalas (today Kocaçay), a small tributary of the Rhyndakos (Adırnas Çayı), in Aezani, Asia Minor (Çavdarhisar in present-day Turkey).

The 2nd-century AD structure was once one of four ancient bridges in Aezani and is assumed to have been the most important crossing-point due to its central location in the vicinity of the Zeus temple and the direct access it provided to the Roman road to Cotyaeum (Kütahya). According to reports by European travellers, the ancient parapet remained in use as late as 1829, having been replaced today by an iron railing.

Around 290 m upstream, another well-preserved, almost identical five-arched Roman bridge leads across the Penkalas.

See also 
 List of Roman bridges
 Roman architecture
 Roman engineering

References

Sources

External links 

Aezani and the Penkalas Bridge at Romeartlover

Roman bridges in Turkey
Deck arch bridges
Stone bridges in Turkey
Phrygia
Buildings and structures in Kütahya Province
Arch bridges in Turkey